Trevin Callistus Bastiampillai (born 26 October 1985) is a Canadian cricket player. He is a right-handed batsman, and a right arm off-spin bowler. He has played two matches for Canada in the ICC Americas Championship in 2006, against Argentina and the USA. He also played for Canada's Under 19 team in 2004 World Cup, as did his brother Gavin.

References

External links

Canadian cricketers
Living people
1985 births
Canada One Day International cricketers
Canada Twenty20 International cricketers
Canadian people of Sri Lankan Tamil descent
Canadian sportspeople of Sri Lankan descent
Cricketers from Colombo
Sri Lankan emigrants to Canada
Wicket-keepers